Hartlaub's turaco (Tauraco hartlaubi) is a species of bird in the family Musophagidae. It is found in Kenya, Tanzania, and Uganda.

The common name and Latin binomial commemorate the German physician and ornithologist  Gustav Hartlaub.

Gallery

References

Hartlaub's turaco
Birds of East Africa
Hartlaub's turaco
Hartlaub's turaco
Taxonomy articles created by Polbot